is the second season of the Fate/kaleid liner Prisma Illya anime series. The episodes were directed by Shin Oonuma and Masato Jinbo and animated by Silver Link. The season is based on the first half of Hiroshi Hiroyama's Fate/kaleid liner Prisma Illya 2wei manga series, which is the second series of the Prisma Illya manga; an alternate universe spin-off of Type-Moon's visual novel Fate/stay night in which the events of the Fourth Holy Grail War from Fate/Zero never occurred and Illya lived a normal life. The plot of this season focuses on the arrival of Illya's "clone" Kuro, Illya learning more about her past as well as her role in the Holy Grail War and finding the rest of the Class Cards.

Prisma Illya 2wei was first announced on September 14, 2013 with the final episode of season one including a teaser at the end, announcing that the anime would return next summer for a second season. The season originally aired from July 10, 2014 to September 9, 2014 on Tokyo MX and lasted ten episodes. Five Blu-ray compilations were released in Japan, with each one containing two episodes, with each one containing a 5-minute-long OVA, the first of which is titled "First Bra: Illya-hen". Sentai Filmworks acquired the rights to the season and released an English dub of the season on DVD and Blu-ray disc on February 16, 2016. The discs include the original Japanese dub with English subtitles.

This season features two pieces of theme music that are used for the episodes: one for the opening and one for the ending. The opening theme is "moving soul" by Minami Kuribayashi and the ending theme is "Two By Two" by Yumeha Kouda.

Episodes

Cast and characters

 Mai Kadowaki as Illyasviel von Einzbern 
 Kaori Nazuka as Miyu Edelfelt
 Chiwa Saito as Kuro / Chloe von Einzbern
 Kana Ueda as Rin Tohsaka
 Shizuka Itou as Luviagelita Edelfelt
 Naoko Takano as Magical Ruby
 Miyu Matsuki as Magical Sapphire
 Noriaki Sugiyama as Shirou Emiya
 Haruhi Terada as Sella
 Miho Miyagawa as Leysritt
 Miki Itou as Taiga Fujimura
 Mariya Ise as Nanaki Moriyama
 Emiri Katō as Tatsuko Gakumazawa
 Kanae Itō as Suzuka Kurihara
 Satomi Satou as Mimi Katsura

Reception

Sales
Prisma Illya 2wei proved to be extremely popular in home video release.

Critical response
Prisma Illya 2wei has been well received by critics, with most reviewers reacting positively to the addition of Kuro into the cast. Review site Anime-Evo gave 2wei an "A", praising the plot, action sequences and characters, especially Kuro for "chang[ing] up the dynamic" of the series. Chris Beveridge of The Fandom Post stated that while the story wasn't as engaging as that of the first season, the inclusion of Kuro and her story in regards to Illya was a good addition to the story and the anime was still entertaining to watch.

See also

List of Fate/stay night characters
List of Fate/Zero characters

References

2014 Japanese television seasons
Lists of Fate/stay night episodes
Magical girl anime and manga